House is an album by Young Buffalo. It was released by Votiv on March 3, 2015. The album was supported by three singles. The video for their first single "Sykia" was released on August 7, 2014. The video for their second single "No Idea" was released on March 4, 2015. The video for their third single "My Place" was released on April 10, 2015.

Track listing
All songs written by Jim Barrett, Ben Yarbrough, and Will Eubanks.

Personnel
Young Buffalo 
 Jim Barrett – guitars, lead vocals
 Ben Yarbrough - guitars, lead vocals
 Will Eubanks - keyboards, piano

Studio
Garrett Ray - percussion

Technical
Dave Schiffman - Engineer, Mixing, Producer
Nick Rowe - Editing
Howie Weinberg - Mastering

Photography
Natalie Moorer - Cover Photo

2015 albums
Young Buffalo albums